Jose Abad Santos, officially the Municipality of Jose Abad Santos, is a 1st class municipality in the province of Davao Occidental, Philippines. According to the 2020 census, it has a population of 73,381 people.

History
The Municipality of Jose Abad Santos was formerly a part of Malita town.  Barrios Batulaki (5,181) and Caburan (6,197) seceded and established as a separate town on August 1, 1948, and was originally named "Trinidad".   The barrio of Caburan became its poblacion or town center. In 1954, the municipality was renamed by Republic Act no. 1206, in honor of José Abad Santos, Chief Justice of the Supreme Court of the Philippines, who was executed by the Japanese invading forces during World War II.

On January 1, 2021, Barangay Caburan experienced a nearby earthquake. Two days later, Jose Abad Santos became the apex of a diarrhea outbreak.

Geography
It is the southernmost municipality on the mainland of Mindanao island. The coastal town is the second largest municipality in Davao Occidental after Malita.

Barangays
Jose Abad Santos is politically subdivided into 26 barangays.

Climate

Demographics

Economy

Vast natural resources can be found, such as the wide stretch of mangroves of the municipality.  Milkfish and tilapia breeding, as well as copra production, are the primary source of income for its people. The long stretch of beaches with brown, black and white sands, together with abundant marine life offshore are the primary natural attractions of Jose Abad Santos.

Government
Municipal officials 2013-2016:
 Mayor: James Y. Joyce
 Vice Mayor: Jason John A. Joyce
 Councilors:
 Frank William Galias
 Maricelle Medel
 Roger Castro
 Louie Tayong
 Maximo Guardados, Jr.
 Joaquin Atay, Sr.
 Dave Dullano
 Jonathan Chua

Transportation 
The municipality can be reached by public utility vehicles plying from Davao City and Digos via the Pan-Philippine Highway. Past the town of Sulop is the junction with Davao del Sur Provincial Highway. Turning east at the junction, head south on the provincial highway to the town of Malita. And to the said municipality, habal-habal or passenger motorcycles ply to the adjacent town Don Marcelino.

Road condition
The road condition of the town is poor. Its road network is mostly unpaved, traversing through high-sloped hilly coastal and mountain roads with the danger of falling rocks from above. Most of the river crossings have no bridges, so drivers traversing the town have to consider if their vehicle is capable of crossing a shallow river. During rainy weather, travelers have to wait for the water level to subside before the river could become accessible again. A trip to the town is considered as either adventurous or dangerous by those who intend to visit depending on their experience, though part of the road heading to Don Marcelino town to the north is paved, made with concrete cement.

Controversy
On August 20, 2013, former provincial representative Marc Douglas Cagas IV complained about the DPWH's complacency about the project involving the improving of roads going to the municipality. He attributed the complacency to the pork barrel scandal that was already happening in the country's politics since several days before the said complaint due to overspending of their budget for the said project.

See also
List of renamed cities and municipalities in the Philippines

References

External links
   Jose Abad Santos Profile at the DTI Cities and Municipalities Competitive Index
 [ Philippine Standard Geographic Code]
 Philippine Census Information
 Local Governance Performance Management System

Municipalities of Davao Occidental